Valentin Daniel Balint (born 7 February 1994) is a Romanian footballer who plays as a striker. He started his professional career at Dinamo București. He is the nephew of former Romanian International footballer Dănuț Lupu.

References

External links
 
 

1994 births
Living people
Footballers from Bucharest
Romanian footballers
Association football forwards
Liga I players
Liga II players
FC Dinamo București players
CSM Corona Brașov footballers
FC Rapid București players
CSM Ceahlăul Piatra Neamț players
FC Dunărea Călărași players
CS Mioveni players
FC Petrolul Ploiești players
CS Concordia Chiajna players